Dalbergia sissoo, known commonly as North Indian rosewood or shisham, is a fast-growing, hardy, deciduous rosewood tree native to the Indian subcontinent and southern Iran. D. sissoo is a large, crooked tree with long, leathery leaves and whitish or pink flowers.

Description
Dalbergia sissoo is a medium to large deciduous tree with a light crown, which reproduces by seeds and suckers. Trunks are often crooked when grown in the open. They have a long taproot and numerous surface roots that produce suckers.

Distribution and habitat
Dalbergia sissoo is native to the foothills of the Himalayas ranging from Afghanistan in the west to Bihar, India, in the east. It also occurs naturally in Iran. Soils range from pure sand and gravel to rich alluvium of river banks; shisham can grow in slightly saline soils. Seedlings are intolerant of shade.

Ecology
Dalbergia sissoo is the larval food plant of the black rajah (Charaxes solon).

Uses

Timber

It is the best known economic timber species of the rosewood genus sold internationally, but it is also used as fuel wood and for shade and shelter.  After teak, it is the most important cultivated timber tree of Bihar, which is the largest producer of shisham timber in India. In Bihar, the tree is planted on roadsides, along canals, and as a shade tree for tea plantations. It is also commonly planted in southern Indian cities such as Bangalore as a street tree.

North Indian rosewood is usually dried before being used in furniture manufacturing, a process commonly known as seasoning. Locally, it is left in  open areas to dry under the sun for about six months. Commercially, it is dried in closed chambers with hot-air circulation for about 7 to 15 days, depending on weather conditions. The ideal moisture level is around 5 to 6% for thinner pieces and up to 11% for thicker ones, depending on use. Any level lower than this can cause sudden cracking of the final products.

North Indian rosewood is among the finest cabinet and veneer timbers. It is the wood from which 'mridanga', the Rajasthani percussion instrument, is often made. In addition to musical instruments, it is used for plywood, agricultural tools, flooring, as a bentwood, and for turning.

The heartwood is golden to dark brown; the sapwood is white to pale brownish white. The heartwood is durable (its specific gravity is 0.7 – 0.8) and is very resistant to fungi, but the sapwood is readily attacked by dry-wood termites and borers.  D. sissoo is known to contain the neoflavonoid dalbergichromene in its stem bark and heartwood.

Fuel wood
 
The calorific value of both the sapwood and heartwood is excellent, being reported to be 4,908 kcal/kg and 5,181 kcal/kg, respectively. As a fuel wood, it is grown on a 10- to 15-year rotation. The tree has excellent coppicing ability, although a loss of vigor after two or three rotations has been reported. The wood makes excellent charcoal for heating and cooking.

Traditional medicine
The tree's seed oil and powdered wood are used in the treatment of skin ailments. Dalbergia sissoo may also have efficacy in the treatment of stomach and blood conditions.

Teeth brushing
Traditionally, slender tree twigs (called datun) are first chewed as a toothbrush and then split as a tongue cleaner. This practise has been in use in Pakistan, Africa, and the Middle East for centuries. Many of India's 80% rural population still start their day with the teeth cleaning twig either with Salvadora persica or Azadirachta indica. In other parts of the world, shisham twigs are still collected and sold in markets for this use in rural areas.

Pesticide 
An ethanolic extract of the fruits of D. sissoo exhibited molluscicidal effects against eggs of the freshwater snail Biomphalaria pfeifferi.

Construction
The juice of this plant is a potent ingredient for a mixture of wall plaster, according to the Samarāṅgaṇa Sūtradhāra, which is a Sanskrit treatise dealing with Śilpaśāstra (Hindu science of art and construction).

Cultivation
Propagation takes place most commonly by root suckers, but also by seeds. The seeds remain viable for only a few months. Seeds should be soaked in water for 48 hours before sowing; 60% – 80% germination can be expected in 1–3 weeks. Seedlings require partial sun or full 
sun. In India, shisham wood trading and its uses are under government restrictions.

Local names
Common names for D. sissoo are sisu, tahli or tali, and irugudujava. Pakistani common names are sheesham/shisham and tahli in Punjabi. In Pushto its name is shewa, and in Persian, it is called jag. In Hindi and Urdu, it is called sheesham. In Bengali, it is called sheeshoo. Local name for Indian rosewood in eastern Uttar Pradesh and western Bihar is seeso.

The wood of D. sissoo is known as sheesham or shisham, and is an important commercial timber.

D. sisso is the state tree of the Indian state of Punjab.

See also
 Arid Forest Research Institute

References

sissoo
Trees of the Indian subcontinent
Trees of Western Asia
Environment of Punjab, India